Ethmia orestella is a moth in the family Depressariidae. It is found in Colorado, United States.

The ground color of the forewings is uniform dull gray-brown with a longitudinal pale streak. The ground color of the hindwings is smoky brown, slightly paler than the forewings.

References

Moths described in 1973
orestella